Jay Bell (born 1965) is an American professional baseball player.

Jay Bell may also refer to 
Jay Bell (writer) (born 1977), American writer
Jay Bell (footballer) (born 1989), English footballer